Hazaribagh is a Thana of Dhaka District in the Division of Dhaka, Bangladesh. Hazaribagh is part of Old Town, Dhaka, Bangladesh. 95% of Bangladesh's tanneries, which is where animal skins are processed to make leather, were located in or around Hazaribagh before they moved to Hemayatpur, Savar. In Hazaribagh, traditional establishments, culture, language and food can be found in daily life practices. Owing to its location near Buriganga River, Hazaribagh shares significant history as well. It is one of the most densely populated places on earth, though it is criticised for its low living standards.

Geography
Its total area is 3.58 km2.

Demographics
This Hazaribagh has a population of 75,458. Males constitute 58.67% of the population, and females 41.33%. Hazaribagh has an average literacy rate of 53.67%, and the national average of 32.4% literate.

Administration
Hazaribagh has 3  Unions/Wards, 15 Mauzas/Mahallas, and 1 village.

Hazaribag Girls' School and College (1971)
 Moneshwar Government Primary School (1964) 
 Mukulika High School (1981)
 Shahid Sheikh Rasel Government High School (2011)
Saleha School And College
Gojmohal Tannery High School (1988)
Institute of Leather Engineering and Technology, University of Dhaka . This is an Institute of the Dhaka University since 2011, It has contain 3 department of Unit-A of Dhaka University.

See also
 Upazilas of Bangladesh
 Districts of Bangladesh
 Divisions of Bangladesh

References 

Old Dhaka
Thanas of Dhaka